Prodromos Katsantonis (born 20 October 1975) is a Cypriot sprinter who specialized in the 100 and 200 metres. He is also a former hurdler. In 200 m he finished sixth the 1998 European Indoor Championships and seventh at the 1998 European Championships.

Personal bests
100 metres - 10.19 s (2003)
200 metres - 20.37 s (1998)
110 metres hurdles - 13.92 s (1995)

References

1975 births
Living people
Cypriot male sprinters
Olympic athletes of Cyprus
Athletes (track and field) at the 1996 Summer Olympics
Athletes (track and field) at the 2000 Summer Olympics
Athletes (track and field) at the 2004 Summer Olympics
World Athletics Championships athletes for Cyprus
Athletes (track and field) at the 1997 Mediterranean Games
Mediterranean Games bronze medalists for Cyprus
Mediterranean Games medalists in athletics